Mihaela Buzărnescu was the defending champion but chose not to participate.

Jaqueline Cristian won the title, defeating Magali Kempen in the final, 6–4, 6–4.

Seeds

Draw

Finals

Top half

Bottom half

References

External Links
Main Draw

ITF Féminin Le Neubourg - Singles